George D. Varney Sr. (June 28, 1903 – September 7, 1982) was an American politician from Maine. Varney, a Republican, served in the Maine Legislature from 1930 to 1932 and again from 1936 to 1948. Varney served in the Maine House of Representatives from 1930 to 1932 and from 1936 to 1942. During his final term, Varney served as Speaker of the Maine House of Representatives. He was elected to represent York County, Maine, including his residence in Kittery, Maine, in the Maine Senate from 1942 to 1948. He served as Senate President from 1945 to 1948.

References

1903 births
1982 deaths
Republican Party members of the Maine House of Representatives
People from Kittery, Maine
Speakers of the Maine House of Representatives
Presidents of the Maine Senate
20th-century American politicians